Salekh Fatekhovich Abdulkayumov (born 13 April 1961) is a Russian professional football coach and a former player.

Club career
He made his Russian Football National League debut for FC Torpedo Ryazan on 25 April 1992 in a game against FC Zenit Izhevsk.

Honours
 Russian Second Division Zone 4 top scorer: 1993 (32 goals).

External links
 

1961 births
People from Dzerzhinsk, Russia
Living people
Soviet footballers
Russian footballers
Association football forwards
Russian football managers
FC Spartak Tambov players
FC Elista players
FC Spartak Ryazan players
Sportspeople from Nizhny Novgorod Oblast